The West Bengal Film Journalists' Association Award for Best Actor in a Leading Role is given yearly by the WBFJA as a part of its annual West Bengal Film Journalists' Association Awards for Bengali films, to recognize the best actor of the previous year.

Superlatives

List of winners

Winners

Nominations 
 2017 Paran Bandopadhyay – Cinemawala as Pranabendu Das and Prosenjit Chatterjee – Khawto as Nirbed Lahiri/Dhrubo (tie)
 Anjan Dutt – Shaheb Bibi Golaam as Jimmy
 Debshankar Haldar – Maya Mridango as Jhakshu Ustad
 Jisshu Sengupta – Byomkesh O Chiriyakhana as Byomkesh Bakshi
 2018 Soumitra Chatterjee – Mayurakshi as Sushovan and Prosenjit Chatterjee – Mayurakshi as Aryanil (tie)
 Ritwick Chakraborty – Maacher Jhol as Dev D aka Devdatto
 Anirban Bhattacharya – Dhananjay as Dhananjoy Chatterjee
 Jisshu Sengupta – Posto as Arnab Lahiri
 Parambrata Chatterjee – Samantaral as Sujan
 2019 Jisshu Sengupta – Ek Je Chhilo Raja as Raja Mahendra Kumar Chowdhury
 Jisshu Sengupta – Ghare & Baire as Amit
 Saswata Chatterjee – Ray as Director
 Prosenjit Chatterjee – Drishtikone as Jion Mitra
 Adil Hussain – Maati as Jamil
 2020 Riddhi Sen – Nagarkirtan as Puti
 Ritwick Chakraborty – Nagarkirtan
 Rudranil Ghosh – Vinci Da
 Prosenjit Chatterjee – Drishtikone
 Shiboprosad Mukherjee – Konthho
 Kaushik Ganguly – Kedara
2021 Parambrata Chatterjee for Dwitiyo Purush as Abhijit Pakrashi/Khoka & Saswata Chatterjee for Chobiyal as Habol
Anirban Bhattacharya for Dracula Sir
Jeet for Asur 
2022 Ritwik Chakraborty for Binisutoy as Kajal Sarkar & Paran Bandopadhyay for Tonic as Jaladhar Sen
Mosharraf Karim for Dictionary
Saswata Chatterjee for Tokhon Kuasa Chilo
Arjun Chakrabarty for Avijatrik

See also 

 West Bengal Film Journalists' Association Awards
 Cinema of India

References 

Film awards for lead actor
Actor